Clifford Rayes Miranda (born 11 July 1982) is an Indian professional football manager and former player who is the current head coach of Indian Super League club Odisha.

In his playing career, he mostly played for Dempo in the National Football League and the I-League from 2000–2015. During his time with the Goan side, Miranda won five league titles and four domestic cup honours. 

Miranda played for the India national team from 2005 to 2014, earning 45 caps and scoring six goals. He was a part of 2008 AFC Challenge Cup winning Indian team, thus qualifying for the AFC Asian Cup after 27 years. He also won two SAFF Championships.

Club career
After starting his career with the Salcete FC, a team renowned in South Goa for being a nursery of young players. He moved to the prestigious Tata Football Academy in Jamshedpur where he honed his football skills for four years.

Clifford was the only TFA graduate from his batch to sign a professional contract when he signed for Dempo, a second division club in 2000. He helped Dempo lift the National League title five times and the Indian Federation Cup in 2004. He was also part of the team that played the 2008 AFC Cup semi-finals.

In July 2015 Miranda was drafted to play for Atlético de Kolkata in the 2015 Indian Super League.

International career
Miranda made his debut against Pakistan in 2005. During the Bob Houghton era, Miranda became a regular member of Houghton's team due to his ability to dribble and deliver deadly crosses from the left side of the field.

Miranda was a part of the Nehru Cup winning squads of 2007 and 2009 and helped Baichung Bhutia, the then captain of the Indian team lift the 2008 AFC Challenge Cup. He was also a member of the India team that participated in the 2011 Asia Cup in Qatar.

International statistics

International Goals

Coaching career
Miranda retired from playing football in 2017 and went into coaching after being convinced to do so by his former coach, Derrick Pereira. He joined his former playing club, Goa, as assistant to Pereira for the club's youth development team and reserve side. In 2018, Miranda became the head coach of Goa Reserves side in the Goa Professional League and I-League 2nd Division.

Honours

Dempo
I-League: 3
2007–08, 2009–10, 2011–12
National Football League: 2
2005, 2007
Durand Cup: 1
2006
Federation Cup: 1
2004
Indian Super Cup: 2
2008, 2010

India
 AFC Challenge Cup: 2008
 SAFF Championship: 2005, 2011; runner-up (2): 2008, 2013
 Nehru Cup: 2007, 2012

References

External links
 Profile at Goal.com
 

Footballers from Goa
Living people
1982 births
2011 AFC Asian Cup players
I-League players
Indian Christians
India international footballers
Dempo SC players
FC Goa players
ATK (football club) players
Indian Super League players
Indian footballers
Indian football managers
Association football wingers
People from Vasco da Gama, Goa
Indian Super League head coaches
FC Goa managers